Ǵurǵevište is a village in the municipality of Vrapčište, North Macedonia. It used to be part of Negotino-Pološko Municipality.

History
According to the 1451-52 Ottoman defter, Ǵurǵevište appears as being inhabited by a Christian population, which based on anthroponymy are largely of Albanian origin. Some families had a mixed Slav-Albanian anthroponomy - that is to say, a Slavic first name and an Albanian last name or last names with Albanian patronyms and Slavic suffixes. 

The names are: Petro, son of Raço; Nenada, son of Konda; Tano, son of Gjuro; Dimitiri, son of Nikolla; Ivan, son of Gjon; Petran, son of Kruz (Kryezi); Bogdan, son of Prekno; Petro, son of Kalatin; Gjorgj (Gjergj), son of Vegatar; Pavl-o, his brother; Pjako (Old man) siromah (poor); Spanqa, son of Brian; Petro, son of Gjon; Daba, son of Gjon; Gjon atmaxha (poulterer); Dimitri, son of Gjon; Grujan, the son of Gjon; Pejo, son of Prelçe (Prela); Stojko, son of Arbanas (Arbneshi).

Demographics
As of the 2021 census, Ǵurǵevište had 198 residents with the following ethnic composition:
Albanians 182
Persons for whom data are taken from administrative sources 14
Macedonians 1
Others 1

According to the 2002 census, the village had a total of 403 inhabitants. Ethnic groups in the village include:
Albanians 399
Macedonians 3
Others 1

References

External links

Villages in Vrapčište Municipality
Albanian communities in North Macedonia